The Schneider Family Book Award is an award given by the American Library Association (ALA) recognizing authors and illustrators for the excellence of portrayal of the disability experience in literature for youth. There is a category for children's books, books appealing to middle grade readers and for young adult literature. The award has been given since 2004. The award was founded by Dr. Katherine Schneider, who was the first blind student to graduate from the Kalamazoo Public School system. Schneider had been helped through school as a child by a librarian at the Michigan Library for the Blind who provided books in Braille to her. The award is given out annually and the winners are announced at the ALA Midwinter Meeting.

Criteria
The person with the disability may be the protagonist or a secondary character
Definition of disability: Dr. Schneider has intentionally allowed for a broad interpretation by her wording, the book “must portray some aspect of living with a disability, whether the disability is physical, mental, or emotional.”  This allows each committee to decide on the qualifications of particular titles. 
Books with death as the main theme are generally disqualified.
The books must be published in English.
The award may be given posthumously.
Term of eligibility extends to publications from the preceding year.
Books previously discussed and voted on are not eligible again.

Winners

References

External links 

 Official site

American children's literary awards
Young adult literature awards
American Library Association awards
Awards established in 2004
2004 establishments in the United States
English-language literary awards
Lists of books